999 (initially known as 999: Dramatic Stories of Real Life Rescues in some listings) is a British docudrama television series presented by Michael Buerk, that premiered on 25 June 1992 on BBC One and ran until 17 September 2003. The series got its name from the emergency telephone number used in the United Kingdom and is the British adaptation of the American series Rescue 911, which premiered in April 1989 and ended in August 1996.

A number of specials and spin-off shows were also aired, including five series of 999 Lifesavers (1994–98) hosted by Buerk and Juliet Morris (later replaced by Donna Bernard), and 999 International in 1997.

History
In the first series, each episode included two reconstructions of real emergencies, using actors and occasionally Buerk himself, as well as some of the real people involved in the emergency. By the second series, episodes of 999 included more reconstructions. While recreating an accident for an episode in 1993, veteran stuntman Tip Tipping was killed in a parachuting accident. In September 2002, it was announced that the series had been cancelled.

Transmissions

Original series

Note: Series 2 was a revised repeat, whilst Series 4 and 8 were compilation series. Compilation episodes aired between series on 29 March 1996, 28 August, 2 September and 9 December 1998

999 Lifesavers

Note: Series 4 was a compilation series.

999 International

Specials

Merchandise

Tie-in publication
 999: Dramatic Stories of Real-Life Rescues by Michael Buerk, published by BBC Books in 1994. .
Features 15 gripping stories as featured on the show, along with 999 Safety Advice: simple, easy-to-understand instructions on how to deal with common emergencies.

 999 Young Lifesavers by Michael Buerk, published by BBC Books in 1996. .
Tying in with the children's television series, "999" and "999 Lifesavers", this book contains instructions on how to react in emergencies. The topics covered include coping with sudden illness, what to do if someone is struck by lightning, survival out of doors, electrical accidents and road accidents. There is also advice on how to avoid accidents in the first place, focusing on, for instance, dangerous plants and animals, and sensible behaviour at the seaside.

Video releases
999: Lifesaver Video (1996)
999: Family Safety Video (1998)

See also
Real Rescues (2007–2013)

Notes

References

External links

1992 British television series debuts
BBC television docudramas
2003 British television series endings